John Bertil "Beppe" Wolgers (10 November 1928 – 6 August 1986) was a Swedish author, poet, translator, lyricist, actor, entertainer and artist.

Career
Wolgers was born in Stockholm, Sweden and was the son of forest ranger John Wolgers and Gerda (née Korsgren). He attended Germantown Friends School in Philadelphia, United States from 1947 to 1948 and Poppius journalistskola and Otte Skölds målarskola from 1946 to 1947. Wolgers was a journalist at Stockholms-Tidningen from 1960 to 1961.

Wolgers had also exhibits together with Ernfrid Bogstedt.

He wrote about a thousand songs and specialized in putting Swedish lyrics to foreign tunes like "Walkin' My Baby Back Home", "Waltz for Debby", "Dat Dere", "Eleanor Rigby", "Take Five" and "Bachianas brasileiras" no 5. He also made several books and films for children, and did a famous series as a slightly crazy goodnight story teller for children in Swedish television 1968–74 and, as notable, the father of Pippi Longstocking in the 1969 TV series. He died in Östersund from a peptic ulcer.

Personal life
Wolgers was married to Kerstin Dunér (born 1932), the daughter of radio inspector Osborn Dunér and his wife. They had four children.

References

External links

1928 births
1986 deaths
Musicians from Stockholm
Swedish-language poets
Swedish songwriters
Swedish artists
Deaths from ulcers
20th-century poets
20th-century Swedish male actors
20th-century Swedish male writers
Germantown Friends School alumni